Asil (alternative spelling: Aseel) 
(Arabic:	أَصِيْل) is an Arabic masculine/feminine given name meaning “evening time”, “nighttime”. Asil can also mean “deep-rooted”, “original”, “noble” with the same spelling and pronunciation. 

It's a Quranic name mentioned 4 times in the Quran at 25:5, 33:42, 48:9 and 76:25. It's also mentioned 3 other times in its plural form (Aasaal) at 13:15, 7:205, 24:36.

People 
 Asil Nadir (born 1941), British businessman
 Aseel Omran (born 1989), Saudi Arabian singer
 Aseel al-Awadhi (born 1969), former member of the National Assembly of Kuwait
 Aseel Al-Hamad, Saudi Arabian interior designer, engineer, and motorsport enthusiast

References